Pierre Guy (born 5 August 1931) is a French former sports shooter. He competed at the 1960 Summer Olympics and the 1964 Summer Olympics.

References

External links
 

1931 births
Possibly living people
French male sport shooters
Olympic shooters of France
Shooters at the 1960 Summer Olympics
Shooters at the 1964 Summer Olympics
People from Pontarlier
Sportspeople from Doubs
20th-century French people